Sinocyclocheilus huizeensis is a species of freshwater ray-finned fish from the family Cyprinidae which is only known from Dalong Spring in the Jinshajiang Drainage, in Huize County, Yunnan, China.

References

Fish described in 2015
Freshwater fish of China
Sinocyclocheilus